Torsten Magnus Cassel (27 January 1907 - 30 July 1974 ) was a Swedish bandleader and pianist.

Biography
Torsten Cassel was born on 27 January 1907 in Spännarhyttan, Västmanland, Sweden, to the engineer Edvard Magnus Cassel and Anna Maria Tillkvist. He studied at Lundsbergs boarding school, at the Royal College of Music, Stockholm, as well as for :sv:Olof Wibergh. In 1930 he debuted as a concert pianist. He was also active as a music pedagogue.

He was married to Beth Ljungdahl, daughter of :sv:Claes Ljungdahl, 1934–1938, and from 1946 with Ulla Ljungström, daughter of Fredrik Ljungström, the latter with whom he had two daughters.

Torsten Cassel died on 30 July 1974 on Östermalm in Stockholm.

Discography in selection
Solitaire (1946), with members from Kungliga Hovkapellet
Skogsnymfer (Wooden nymphs) (1946, with members from Kungliga Hovkapellet
Favoritmelodier 1 och 2 (1948), Torsten Cassel, piano with orchestra

Sources
Dödsfall, Svenska Dagbladet (1 August 1974)
Torsten Cassel Svensk mediadatabas

References

1907 births
1974 deaths
20th-century pianists
Swedish bandleaders
Swedish pianists